The Uruguayan ambassador in the City of Brussels is the official representative of the Government in Montevideo to the Government of Belgium.

List of representatives

References 

 
Belgium
Uruguay